Hasdeo Express is a Superfast Intercity Express train which it runs between Korba to Raipur corridor which comes from South East Central Railway zone in Chhattisgarh state of India. Currently there are 2 sets of trains are running in this section. This train is named after Indian tributary river of Mahanadi that is Hasdeo river.

Overview
 1st set of train inaugurated with LHB coaches.Piyush Goyal had flagged off this train
 2nd set of train inaugurates as ICF coaches.
 After that,Both sets of this train running as LHB coach

Coach Composition
This train Had LHB coach.
 2 EOG
 4 Second Class(Unreserved)
 6 Second Class(Reserved)
 2 AC Chair Car

Route & halts

 Korba
 Champa
 Akaltara
 Bilaspur
 Belha
 Bhatapara
 Tilda Neora
 Raipur

Traction & maintenance

The two sets of Hasdeo Express hauls by WAP-7 of Bhilai Loco Shed.

References

Transport in Raipur, Chhattisgarh
Transport in Korba, Chhattisgarh
Named passenger trains of India
Railway services introduced in 2018